The Graham Seamount is a seamount located in the Pacific Ocean off the coast of Haida Gwaii, British Columbia, Canada.

See also
Volcanology of Canada
Volcanology of Western Canada
List of volcanoes in Canada

References

 British Columbia Marine Topography

Seamounts of the Pacific Ocean
Volcanoes of British Columbia
Seamounts of Canada